The Carrothers Commission, formally The Advisory Commission on the Development of Government in the Northwest Territories, was a commission set up by the government of Canada to study the future of government of the Northwest Territories. It was led by A.W.R. Carrothers, Dean of law at the University of Western Ontario. The other two members were Jean Beetz, law professor at the University of Montreal and a noted authority on the Canadian Constitution and John Parker, the Mayor of Yellowknife at the time and a mining engineer.

The commission was established in April 1963 by the government of Lester B. Pearson. The three-man membership was appointed in 1965. It conducted surveys of opinion in the NWT in 1965 and 1966 and reported in 1966. Major recommendations included that the seat of government of the territories should be located in the territories (the Northwest Territories Legislative Council was based in the national capital, Ottawa, at the time). Yellowknife was selected as the territorial capital as a result. Transfer of many responsibilities from the federal government to that of the territories was recommended and carried out. This included responsibility for education, small business, public works, social assistance and local government. The commission also reported that while division of the NWT was not advisable at that time, it was in the long term probably desirable and inevitable. These findings eventually led to the creation of Nunavut.

References

See also
History of Northwest Territories capital cities

History of the Northwest Territories
Canadian commissions and inquiries
1963 establishments in Canada
1966 documents
1960s in Canada